SSG Wilfred DeFour (April 12, 1918 – December 8, 2018) was a Panamanian-American soldier and centenarian. Born in Colón, Panama in 1918, DeFour emigrated with his family to the United States when Wilfred was still a child. The family settled in the Harlem section of New York City. 

During World War II DeFour served in the United States Army as an aircraft technician with the distinguished Tuskegee Airmen, the first all African-American air corps. DeFour died in December 2018 at the age of 100, he was last surviving member of the Tuskegee Airmen.

Military service

World War II

DeFour joined the Air Corps in 1942, and after completing basic training he was assigned to the 366th Air Service Squadron, and stationed in Italy in 1943. In November 2018, DeFour appeared in a ceremony renaming a Harlem post office in honor of the Tuskegee Airmen.

Education
Dewitt Clinton High School
City College and NYU's school of Commerce.
Tuskegee Institute (1942)

Awards
 Congressional Gold Medal awarded to the Tuskegee Airmen in 2006.

Personal life
DeFour was born in Colón, Panama and emigrated to New York. After the war, he completed his associate and bachelor's degrees in real estate and business administration. He worked for the United States Postal Service, and retired after 33 years. Defour was married to Ruth Christian (died in 2005). Together they had two children Wilfred, Jr. and Darlene. He was survived by a daughter.

Death
DeFour had been receiving at home care, and a care provider found him in the bathroom of his Fifth Avenue apartment in Harlem, New York at 9 a.m. Authorities said he died of natural causes.

See also
 Executive Order 9981
 List of Tuskegee Airmen
 Military history of African Americans

References

Notes

External links
 Tuskegee Airmen at Tuskegee University
 Tuskegee Airmen Archives at the University of California, Riverside Libraries.
 Tuskegee Airmen, Inc.
 Tuskegee Airmen National Historic Site (U.S. National Park Service) 
 Tuskegee Airmen National Museum
 Fly (2009 play about the 332d Fighter Group)
 Executive Order 9981
 List of African American Medal of Honor recipients
 Military history of African Americans

1918 births
2018 deaths
African-American centenarians
American centenarians
Men centenarians
Military personnel from New York City
Tuskegee Airmen
Tuskegee University alumni
Military personnel from Tuskegee, Alabama
Congressional Gold Medal recipients
People from Colón, Panama
Panamanian emigrants to the United States
Panamanian people of African descent
United States Army Air Forces personnel of World War II
United States Army Air Forces non-commissioned officers
21st-century African-American people